Jeremy Dehner (born April 25, 1987) is an American professional ice hockey defenseman who is currently playing for Florida Everblades in the ECHL. He formerly played in the Deutsche Eishockey Liga (DEL).

Playing career
Dehner originally played with UMass Lowell's college team River Hawks of the NCAA before turning professional with the Norfolk Admirals of the AHL.

Dehner left North America in pursuing a European career, signing with Finnish club, Jokerit of the SM-liiga. Dehner established himself amongst the blueline with Jokerit over four seasons with the club. Upon their acceptance into the Kontinental Hockey League, Dehner left Finland to sign a contract in Germany with EHC München of the DEL on June 18, 2014. After capturing the German championship with the München team in 2016, he left the club and was picked up by fellow DEL side EHC Wolfsburg in July 2016.

After concluding his third season with the Grizzlys in 2018–19, Dehner mutually opted with the club not to take up the further year option on his contract, leaving as a free agent on March 8, 2019.

Dehner returned to play professionally in North America for the first time since 2010, agreeing to a contract with the Florida Everblades of the ECHL on October 7, 2019, to start the 2019–20 season. Dehner made just 10 appearances through the course of the season with the Everblades, before ending his contract and returning to Finland, playing 1 Liiga game with HIFK before the season was cancelled due to COVID-19.

Personal
Former NHLer Gary Suter and Olympic-medalist Bob Suter are Dehner's uncles. His cousin is Minnesota Wild's alternate captain Ryan Suter.

Career statistics

Awards and honors

References

External links

Living people
1987 births
American men's ice hockey defensemen
Florida Everblades players
Green Bay Gamblers players
Grizzlys Wolfsburg players
HIFK (ice hockey) players
Ice hockey players from Wisconsin
Jokerit players
UMass Lowell River Hawks men's ice hockey players
EHC München players
Norfolk Admirals players